Malaya Nisogora is a rural locality (a village) in Leshukonsky District, Arkhangelsk Oblast, Russia. The population was 14 as of 2012.

Geography 
Malaya Nisogora is located 21 km northwest of Leshukonskoye (the district's administrative centre) by road. Bolshaya Nisogora is the nearest rural locality.

References 

Rural localities in Leshukonsky District
Leshukonsky District